The 2018–19 Top League was the 16th season of Japan's top-tier domestic rugby union competition, the Top League.

Competition rules

The sixteen Top League teams were divided into two conferences for the first stage of the competition; each team played the seven other teams in their conferences once.

All sixteen teams then progressed to a play-off stage; the top four teams in each conference advanced to the title play-offs and the bottom four teams in each conference to the 9th-place play-offs, which determined the final positions for the season. The title play-offs doubled up as the All-Japan Rugby Football Championship, which would no longer include university teams. The bottom four teams in the 9th-place play-off all played in relegation play-off matches.

Teams

The following teams took part in the 2018 Top League competition:

 Honda Heat won the 2017–18 Top Challenge League to win promotion back to the Top League after a one-season absence.
 Hino Red Dolphins won their promotion play-off match to win promotion to the Top League for the first time in their history.

First Stage : Red Conference

Standings

The current standings for the 2018 Top League First Stage Red Conference are:

Matches

The 2018 Top League First Stage Red Conference fixtures are:

Round 1

Round 2

 The match between Kobelco Steelers and Munakata Sanix Blues scheduled for Round 2 was postponed following the Hokkaido Eastern Iburi earthquake and was rescheduled for 29 September.

Round 3

Round 4

Round 2 (rescheduled)

Round 5

Round 6

Round 7

First Stage : White Conference

Standings

The current standings for the 2018 Top League First Stage White Conference are:

Matches

The 2018 Top League First Stage White Conference fixtures are:

Round 1

Round 2

Round 3

Round 4

Round 5

Round 6

Round 7

Second stage

Standings

The final standings for the 2018 Top League were:

Title play-offs

The four quarter final winners qualified for the semi-finals, while the losers qualified for the 5th-place semi-finals.

The two semi-final winners qualified for the final, while the losers qualified for the 3rd-place match. The two 5th-place semi-final winners qualified for the 5th-place match, while the losers qualified for the 7th-place match.

The final matches determined the final standings.

9th-place play-offs

The four 9th-place quarter final winners qualified for the 9th-place semi-finals, while the losers qualified for the 13th-place semi-finals and the relegation play-offs.

The two 9th-place semi-final winners qualified for the 9th-place final, while the losers qualified for the 11th-place match. The two 13th-place semi-final winners qualified for the 13th-place match, while the losers qualified for the 15th-place match.

The final matches will determine the final standings.

See also

 2018–19 Top League Cup
 2018 Top Challenge League

Notes

References

2018
2018–19 in Japanese rugby union
2018–19 rugby union tournaments for clubs